Wonder Woman is a 2017 superhero film based on the DC Comics character of the same name. Produced by Warner Bros. Pictures, DC Films, Atlas Entertainment and Cruel and Unusual Films, and distributed by Warner Bros. Pictures, it is the fourth installment of the DC Extended Universe (DCEU), and a prequel/spin-off to Batman v Superman: Dawn of Justice (2016). Directed by Patty Jenkins and written by Allan Heinberg from a story by Heinberg, Zack Snyder and Jason Fuchs, Wonder Woman stars Gal Gadot in the title role, alongside Chris Pine, Robin Wright, Danny Huston, David Thewlis, Connie Nielsen and Elena Anaya. It is the second live action theatrical film featuring Wonder Woman following her debut in Batman v Superman: Dawn of Justice. In Wonder Woman, the Amazon princess Diana sets out to stop World War I, believing the conflict was started by the longtime enemy of the Amazons, Ares, after American pilot and spy Steve Trevor crash-lands on their island Themyscira and informs her about it.

Development of a live-action Wonder Woman film began in 1996, with Ivan Reitman to produce and possibly direct. The project floundered in development hell for many years; Jon Cohen, Todd Alcott and Joss Whedon, among others, were also attached to the project at various points. Warner Bros. announced the film in 2010 and Jenkins signed on to direct in 2015. Inspiration for Wonder Woman was drawn from Wonder Woman creator William Moulton Marston's 1940s stories and George Pérez's 1980s stories about Wonder Woman, as well as the New 52 incarnation of the character. Principal photography began on November 21, 2015, with filming taking place in the United Kingdom, France and Italy before finishing on May 6, 2016, the 123rd anniversary of Marston's birth. Additional filming took place in November 2016.

Wonder Woman had its world premiere in at Pantages Theatre in Hollywood on May 26, 2017, and was theatrically released worldwide on June 2, 2017, by Warner Bros. Pictures. The film received positive reviews, being noted for it's cultural significance, with praise for its direction, performances, visuals, story and musical score, though some criticism was directed towards the climax. It grossed over $822 million worldwide, making it the tenth highest-grossing film of 2017 and was the highest-grossing film by a solo female director until it was overtaken by Hi, Mom. The American Film Institute selected it as one of the top ten films of 2017 and it won the Hugo Award for Best Dramatic Presentation in 2018. A sequel, Wonder Woman 1984, was released in December 2020, with Jenkins returning as director and Gadot, Pine, Wright and Nielsen reprising their roles. A third film was in development, with Jenkins and Gadot set to return but was ultimately canceled.

Plot

In present-day Paris, Diana Prince receives a photographic plate from Wayne Enterprises of herself and four men taken during World War I, prompting her to recall her past. The daughter of Queen Hippolyta, Diana is raised on the hidden island of Themyscira, home to the Amazons, women warriors created by the Olympian gods to protect mankind. Hippolyta explains their history to Diana, including how Ares became jealous of humanity and orchestrated its destruction. When the other gods attempted to stop him, Ares killed all but Zeus, who used the last of his power to wound Ares and force his retreat. Before dying, Zeus left the Amazons a weapon, the "god-killer", to prepare them for Ares' return. Hippolyta reluctantly agrees to let her sister, General Antiope, train Diana as a warrior.

In 1918, Diana, now a young woman, rescues US pilot Captain Steve Trevor when his plane crashes off the Themysciran coast. The island is soon invaded by German soldiers, who had been pursuing Steve. The Amazons wipe out the German landing force at the expense of heavy losses, with Antiope sacrificing herself to save Diana. Steve is interrogated with the Lasso of Hestia and reveals that a great war is consuming the outside world and that he is an Allied spy. He has stolen a notebook from the Germans' chief chemist, Dr. Isabel Maru, who is attempting to engineer a deadlier form of mustard gas under the orders of General Erich Ludendorff. Believing Ares to be responsible for the war, Diana arms herself with the "god-killer" sword, the lasso, and armor before leaving Themyscira with Steve to locate and stop Ares for good.

In London, they deliver Maru's notebook to the Supreme War Council, where Sir Patrick Morgan is trying to negotiate an armistice with Germany. Diana translates Maru's notes, revealing that the Germans plan to release the deadly gas at the Western Front. Although forbidden by his commander to act, Steve, with secret funding from Morgan, recruits Moroccan spy Sameer, Scottish marksman Charlie, and Native American smuggler Chief Napi to help prevent the gas from being released. The team reaches the front in Belgium. Diana goes alone through No Man's Land and captures the enemy trench, liberating the nearby village of Veld with the aid of the Allied forces. The team briefly celebrates, taking a photograph in the village, where Diana and Steve fall in love.

The team learns that a gala will be held at the nearby German High Command. Steve and Diana separately infiltrate the party; Steve intends to locate the gas and destroy it and Diana hopes to kill Ludendorff, believing that he is Ares. Steve stops her to avoid jeopardizing his mission, but this allows Ludendorff to unleash the gas on Veld, killing its inhabitants. Blaming Steve for intervening, Diana pursues Ludendorff to a base where the gas is being loaded into a bomber aircraft bound for London. Diana fights and kills him, but is confused and disillusioned when his death does not stop the war.

Sir Patrick appears and reveals himself as Ares. He tells Diana that although he has subtly given humans ideas and inspirations, it is ultimately their decision to resort to violence, as they are inherently corrupt. When Diana attempts to kill Ares with the "god-killer" sword, he destroys it, telling Diana that, as the daughter of Zeus and Hippolyta, she is the "god-killer". He fails to persuade Diana to help him destroy mankind to restore paradise on Earth. While the two battle, Steve's team destroys Maru's laboratory. Steve hijacks and pilots the bomber carrying the poison to a safe altitude and detonates it, blowing up the plane and himself. Ares attempts to direct Diana's rage and grief at Steve's death by convincing her to kill Maru, but the memories of her experiences with Steve cause her to realize that humans have good within them. She spares Maru and redirects Ares's lightning into him, killing him for good. Later, the team celebrates the end of the war.

In the present day, Diana sends an email to Bruce Wayne thanking him for the photographic plate of her and Steve. She continues to fight on the world's behalf as Wonder Woman.

Cast

 Gal Gadot as Diana Prince / Wonder Woman: An immortal Amazon warrior demigoddess who is the crown princess of Themyscira and the daughter of Queen Hippolyta and Zeus being raised by the Amazons. Describing Wonder Woman and her appeal, Gadot said "She's relatable. She has the heart of a human and is very compassionate, but her experiences—or lack of them, her naivete, really—make her interested in everything around her and able to view the world in a way that we'd all like to: with a genuine curiosity." On Diana's relationship with her mother, Gadot said "Diana is a very opinionated girl. Her mother is very opinionated. Her mother is very protective as well and they have, you know, the very natural clash that a mother has with her daughter, with their daughters, the first time they want to leave home." On taking on the role as Wonder Woman, Gadot stated "I feel very privileged that I got the opportunity to portray such an iconic, strong female character. I adore this character and everything that she stands for and everything that she symbolizes." On Diana going to the world, Gadot stated "When Diana comes to the real world she's completely oblivious about gender and society rules, that women are not equal to men." Describing Diana's relationship with her mother and aunts, Jenkins said "She is the only child they raised together. And their love for her manifests in a different way for each of them." On working with Gadot, Jenkins said "Gal quickly became the person I wanted to talk to about everything. We'd shoot together all day. And then on weekends, we'd be like, 'What do you want to do?' That's maybe not totally normal." Additionally, Lilly Aspell and Emily Carey portray Diana at ages 8 and 12, respectively.
 Chris Pine as Steve Trevor: An American pilot and the love interest of Diana. On his role for the film, Pine said "I am an American pilot who's a spy. It's like a boy's dream: You're either a spy or a fighter pilot. The first thing I wanted to be was a fighter pilot a long time ago. I wanted to be Goose [from Top Gun]". As to how his mortal character would interact with an Amazon, Pine stated "When I first read the script, it had elements of Romancing the Stone, kind of a very classic fish out of water. Two people that don't really bond well at first and they're butting heads and just fun, witty banter". When speaking about meeting the director and being cast, Pine said "Patty is a pretty incredible human being. When we first met about the part of Steve, she sat across from me and essentially acted out the entire film over the course of a two-hour lunch. She was so specific, so articulate and so ardent. I would've said yes just for Patty alone." Pine went through a workout regimen for the film, commenting, "I got in incredible shape for this film" but also joking "I was also wearing about 75 pounds of clothing. What I realized is that I made a major mistake, I got in great shape and they just put clothes over all my hard work."
 Robin Wright as Antiope: The sister of Hippolyta, general of the Amazonian army, Diana's aunt and mentor. On being cast for the film, Wright said "It's two-fold because when Patty Jenkins called me, the director, it was a three-minute long conversation. She said 'I'm doing a movie about Wonder Woman. Do you want to be her trainer?' And I was like, 'Yes. Of course.' And the general of the Amazonian army. That was pretty cool." Describing her character mentoring and training Diana to be a warrior, Wright said "It's a sixth sense that it is coming and I think that's also in the mythological story behind Antiope and Queen Hippolyta. They know it's coming and it's her duty as the aunt to her young niece to make sure she is the fiercest warrior of all time." On the Amazons fighting style, Wright said "It's hand combat. Yes, swords and knives and arrows, but the precision that they have, right, as these warrior women; it's so nice to see that disparity between what we had in the day of just raw fighting materials and the guns and how easy that is in comparison." The message of the film, Wright stated "is not just female empowerment. It's about love and justice. That's what the film's about. And what a great message to spread to our little ones." Commenting about training for the film, Wright said "The most empowering was to get into that physical shape. So we were doing horseback riding training, weight training, martial arts and 2,000 to 3,000 calories a day".
 Danny Huston as Erich Ludendorff: An iron-fisted general of the German Army during World War I. Huston described Ludendorff as a "pragmatist, realist, patriotic, fighting for his country", further explaining, "he lost his son on the German front lines and was just quite tortured, diabolical, stubborn and believes that what he's doing is for the betterment of mankind." On his character, Huston said "Ludendorff is a believer that war is a natural habitat for humans." Huston stated the film as an anti-war film and "somebody like Ludendorff would probably think that the idea that love conquers all is quite a naive concept. But finally it's true and sometimes the best way to examine mankind is from another perspective." On the genre of the film, Huston said "It's Greek mythology. It's the origin of story and sometimes we need demigods to look at us to understand what our weaknesses are. It serves the mythological world."
 David Thewlis as Sir Patrick: A speaker for peace on the Imperial War Cabinet later revealed to be Ares, based on the Greek mythological god of war, who is in disguise and as part of his deceptive master plan of conquest and destruction. Describing the Sir Patrick persona of his character, Thewlis said "Sir Patrick's entire drive through the other half of the story is to bring about the armistice. That's his whole intention no matter what's going on. He meets Diana and sees in her somebody who is sympathetic to his cause, quite vehemently so."
 Connie Nielsen as Hippolyta: The Amazon Queen of Themyscira and Diana's mother. After meeting the director for the role, Nielsen said "Patty and I met in London and we just hit it off from the get-go. We couldn't stop talking. What was supposed to be a one-hour meeting turned into a two-and-a-half-hour lunch and we just really got each other." She described Jenkins's directing style for the film as "She's also the kind of director that I really flourish under. She has very strong and particular and specific ideas about what it is she wants to say. She comes from a place of strength always. And so, when you are dealing with someone like that, you feel absolutely free to be vulnerable, to be creative and I am a big researcher." On playing the character, Nielsen said "It was a complete and utter pleasure and I absolutely loved every second of playing her." On her character being Diana's mother and Amazonian queen, Nielsen stated "I'm queen and I'm preparing my child for a world that entails a lot of responsibility. So it was important to me to bring that into the character." She read The Amazons by Adrienne Mayor to familiarize herself with women warriors and said "I used what I learned in Mayor's book as a rallying cry for how I approached Hippolyta. And then, of course, what is a leader who is elected by her peers every year and has been doing this for a thousand years? That too was interesting to think about". Nielsen went through a workout regimen for the film, saying "I did six hours a day. You know, two hours of weight training, two hours of swords training and then two hours of horseback riding". Producer Zack Snyder was the one who fought for Nielsen to get cast after Charlize Theron turned down the role.
 Elena Anaya as Dr. Isabel Maru: The chief chemist associated with General Ludendorff who specializes in chemistry and poisons. On her role, Anaya said "Well, it was a small role in this big ensemble, but it is an important character in the story. I'm going to be a big nightmare" for Wonder Woman and Steve Trevor. Describing her character, Anaya said "Dr. Maru loves rage and enjoys people's pain. She's creating terrible weapons and her purpose in life is to kill as many people as possible and provoke as much pain as possible". She researched World War I and Fritz Haber, the scientist who created mustard gas, to prepare for the role. On the character's facial scars, Anaya stated "I went to Patty Jenkins and asked 'What happened to her?' And she said 'She did it on purpose.' I was like, 'What? Patty, you're going further than I ever imagined.' She said 'She wants to provoke painful suffering, so she tested her own gas on her own face. She wanted to know how deep this form of her gas would go, so she put it on her own face.' You can see half of her face is completely gone. This is the sadistic side of Dr. Maru". She also stated her character "is quite the opposite to the lead role of this movie, one of the strongest characters ever of DC comics, Wonder Woman. I can tell you that Doctor Poison is someone with a capacity to provoke so much pain." On Dr. Maru's relationship with General Ludendorff, Anaya said "I think that they have a relationship based on loyalty. Ludendorff is a very tormented General that lacks self-confidence. That's why, in part, he takes these drugs that Dr. Poison gives him. They are from different worlds, but they complement each other".
 Lucy Davis as Etta Candy: Steve Trevor's secretary who befriends Diana. Describing her character, Davis said "She's a woman in a man's world and so being heard and seen aren't the easiest things, but it kind of doesn't deter her", adding, "Etta is unapologetically herself and I think that that's the thing that has drawn me to her the most". When asked if she was previously familiar with the character, Davis responded, "No. I wasn't. It took me a while to know that I was auditioning for Etta because even when I found out it was Wonder Woman, I still had no idea what the role was. It took a little while then I Googled the character". On Etta Candy's relationship with Steve Trevor, Davis said "One of the great things that Etta gets to work with Steve Trevor is because Steve is not your typical man, in that he does entrust her with things that in 1918 probably wouldn't have been entrusted to a secretary of somebody who is quite important", further explaining, "So I think that [Trevor] needs her just as much as she needs that because now she's been given responsibility that she wouldn't have normally be given before and equally he has somebody who could probably fly under the radar a bit. So he can trust the person who no one's really looking at".
 Saïd Taghmaoui as Sameer: A secret agent and ally of Steve Trevor. On his casting, Taghmaoui stated "I was among hundreds of potential candidates and I slowly became the favorite", adding, "It wasn't easy. It took me three months. [I'll have to go through] extensive physical training."
 Ewen Bremner as Charlie: A sharpshooter and ally of Steve Trevor. On his role, Bremner said "I play a character who's enlisted by Wonder Woman to help save the world as part of a small, unlikely band". Describing his character, Bremner stated "He's a shellshocked soldier who's been discharged from the war and is brought back to help on a secret mission". On working with Jenkins, Bremner commented, "Patty Jenkins is a force of nature. She has fantastic vision, strength and enthusiasm, which is completely infectious and motivates a cast and crew of thousands to really go beyond themselves."
 Eugene Brave Rock as Chief:A Blackfoot demi-god, and a smuggler who trades with both sides of the war and knows how to get people across the front lines. On his casting, Brave Rock said "I had no idea it was for Wonder Woman. I lost it when I showed up and I couldn't remember my lines. I didn't take it literally until a month later, I got a call saying I got the role and they wanted me to fly to London for a fitting." Brave Rock raised several concerns with Jenkins over the representation of the character in the film, particularly that he was not comfortable playing into stereotypes and that he was not keen on his character being simply known as "Chief". Jenkins responded by giving him some extra creative control over his character which Brave Rock says was "unprecedented".
 Lisa Loven Kongsli as Menalippe: Antiope's lieutenant and Diana's aunt. Describing her character, Kongsli said "Menalippe is a fearless warrior with a strong justice needs. She lives with the other Amazons on the island Themyscira and exercising continuous battle to assist man in the fight for the good." On filming, Kongsli stated "It's a blast. I've worked damn hard to make this happen, so it's absolutely absurd and fun all at once."

Additionally, Mayling Ng, Florence Kasumba, Madeleine Vall Beijner, Hayley Jane Warnes, Ann Wolfe and Eleanor Matsuura portray Orana, Acantha, Egeria, Aella, Artemis and Epione, respectively, all of whom are Amazons. James Cosmo appears as Douglas Haig, Steffan Rhodri appears as Darnell and Dutch supermodel Doutzen Kroes portrays the Amazon Venelia. Samantha Jo was cast as the Amazonian Euboea and previously played the Kryptonian, Car-Vex, in Man of Steel. Zack Snyder also makes a brief cameo appearance in the film as an unnamed soldier.

Production

Background
Development for a live action Wonder Woman feature film began in 1996, with Ivan Reitman attached as producer and possible director. In 1999 the project became attached to Jon Cohen, who adapted Wonder Woman for producer Joel Silver, with the hope that Sandra Bullock would star. By 2001, Todd Alcott was hired to write the screenplay, with Silver Pictures backing the project. At that time, Mariah Carey and Catherine Zeta-Jones were also rumored to be possible candidates for the role of Wonder Woman. Leonard Goldberg focused on Bullock who said that she was approached for the role. Lucy Lawless, the star of Xena: Warrior Princess, was also under consideration, though she stated that she would have been more interested if Wonder Woman was portrayed as a "flawed hero". The screenplay went through various drafts written by Alcott, Cohen, Becky Johnston and Philip Levens, and by August 2003, Levens had been replaced by screenwriter Laeta Kalogridis.

In March 2005, Warner Bros. and Silver Pictures announced that Joss Whedon would write and direct the film. Early drafts of his screenplay included Steve Trevor as the narrator, a fierce battle between Diana and her mother over Trevor's welfare and after leaving Themyscira, his need to frequently rescue a Diana rendered helpless by the modern world. Whedon was not able to complete a final version of his screenplay and left the project in 2007.

Although Whedon stated in May 2005 that he would not cast the part of Wonder Woman until he finished the script, Kate Beckinsale was linked to the part. In 2010, Whedon admitted that he did have an actress in mind for the part, stating that "Wonder Woman was basically Angelina Jolie."

A day before Whedon's departure from Wonder Woman, Warner Bros. and Silver Pictures purchased a spec script for the film written by Matthew Jennison and Brent Strickland. Set during World War II, the script impressed executives at Silver Pictures. However, Silver stated that he had purchased the script because he did not want the rights reverting; while stating the script had good ideas, Silver did not want the film to be a period piece. That same year, Warner Bros. began development of a Justice League film with Michele and Kieran Mulroney writing the screenplay. The film, entitled Justice League: Mortal, was to be directed by George Miller and would have featured Wonder Woman in her cinematic debut. Australian model Megan Gale was ultimately cast in the role in January 2008. The film would later be cancelled following production delays and budgetary concerns. By April 2008, Silver hired Jennison and Strickland to write a new script set in contemporary times that would not depict Wonder Woman's origin, but explore Paradise Island's history.

Development

In 2010, Warner Bros. stated that a Wonder Woman film was in development, along with films based on DC Comics superheroes the Flash and Aquaman. Both Wonder Woman and Aquaman were still under consideration for solo film subjects as of June 2013. DC Entertainment president Diane Nelson said Wonder Woman "has been, since I started, one of the top three priorities for DC and for Warner Bros. We are still trying right now, but she's tricky." On October 5, 2013, WB chairman and CEO Kevin Tsujihara said he wanted to get Wonder Woman in a film or on TV. Shortly afterward, Paul Feig said he had pitched the studio an idea for Wonder Woman as an action-comedy film. The studio then began to search for female directors to direct the film. While Michelle MacLaren was the studio's initial choice to direct (and while she initially indicated interest), she eventually left the project due to creative differences.

In 2015, Patty Jenkins accepted an offer to direct Wonder Woman, based on a screenplay by Allan Heinberg and a story co-written by Heinberg and Zack Snyder and Jason Fuchs. Screenwriter Allan Heinberg's work had to be finished and rewritten by Jenkins and Geoff Johns after he had left to work on a TV show. Producer Charles Roven said that the duo had done "a tremendous amount of collaboration". Johns was initially given screenplay credit by the studio but was left out in the official credits by the WGA. Of this version, Gadot stated that,

for a long time, people didn't know how to approach the story. When Patty and I had our creative conversations about the character, we realized that Diana can still be a normal woman, one with very high values, but still a woman. She can be sensitive. She is smart and independent and emotional. She can be confused. She can lose her confidence. She can have confidence. She is everything. She has a human heart.

This version was conceived of as a prequel to the first live-action, theatrical appearance of Wonder Woman, in the 2016 film, Batman v Superman: Dawn of Justice, placing Wonder Woman in the 1910s and World War I (a decision which differs from her comic book origins as a supporter of the Allies during World War II). As for story development, Jenkins credits the stories by the character's creator William Moulton Marston in the 1940s and George Perez's seminal stories in the 1980s in which he modernized the character. In addition, it follows some aspects of DC Comics' origin changes in The New 52 reboot, where Diana is the daughter of Zeus. Jenkins cited Richard Donner's Superman as an inspiration.

Casting

In late 2013, Zack Snyder cast Gal Gadot in the role of Wonder Woman for the 2016 film, Batman v Superman: Dawn of Justice over Élodie Yung and Olga Kurylenko. Some fans initially reacted to this choice by criticizing Gadot's appearance. Snyder later commented on his decision to cast Gadot, stating that he tested a "bunch of actresses, as you can imagine. But the thing with Gal is that she's strong, she's beautiful and she's a kind person, which is interesting, but fierce at the same time. It's that combination of being fierce but kind at the same time that we were looking for. Gadot described Diana as having "the heart of a human so she can be emotional, she's curious, she's compassionate, she loves people. And then she has the powers of a goddess. She's all for good, she fights for good." She also said that Diana has "many strengths and powers, but at the end of the day she's a woman with a lot of emotional intelligence". As to how her character is different from her appearance in Batman v Superman: Dawn of Justice, Gadot said "We go back 100 years to when she's more naive", further explaining, "She's this young idealist. She's pure. Very different to the experienced, super-confident, grown-up woman you've seen". Gadot underwent a diet and training regimen, practiced different martial arts and gained 17 pounds of muscle for the role. Gadot was previously offered a different role (as a villain) in Man of Steel, which she declined because she was pregnant at the time; this allowed her to later be cast as Wonder Woman in the film's follow-up. Gadot signed a three-picture deal. She was paid a base salary of $300,000 for the film itself.

Chris Pine was cast as Steve Trevor, a character he described as a "rogue-ish, cynical realist who's seen the awful brutish nature of modern civilization" and added that he is a "worldly guy, a charming guy". He signed a multi-picture deal. Lucy Davis' performance as Etta Candy is the first live-action cinematic portrayal of the character. As well, Elena Anaya's performance as Doctor Poison is the cinematic debut of that character. Nicole Kidman was in negotiations for the role of Queen Hippolyta, but was forced to drop out due to scheduling conflicts with Big Little Lies.

Filming
Principal photography on the film began on November 21, 2015, under the working title Nightingale. Among the film sets were Lower Halstow, Kent, and Australia House in England  and the Sassi di Matera, Castel del Monte and Camerota in Southern Italy. Matthew Jensen was the director of photography, filming in the United Kingdom, France and Italy. Production in London concluded on March 13, 2016. Hatfield House in Hertfordshire, England was also used a filming location.

On March 20, 2016, filming was underway in Italy. In late April, filming took place at the Louvre Museum in Paris, France, where a Wayne Enterprises truck was spotted alongside Gadot. Principal photography finished on May 9, 2016. Patty Jenkins and director of photography Matt Jensen said that the film's look was inspired by painter John Singer Sargent. Jenkins said she shot the movie on film instead of digital video "because there's a certain type of epic grander escapism that film gives you that you cannotyou will struggle very hardto get that on video". Reshoots took place in November 2016, while Gadot was five months pregnant. A green cloth was placed over her stomach to edit out her pregnancy during post-production.

To find the perfect location to shoot the Amazon island of Themyscira, the birthplace of Wonder Woman herself, the film's producers searched all over the world, finally settling on the Cilentan Coast: a stretch of coastline on the Tyrrhenian Sea, located in the Province of Salerno in Southern Italy. It was chosen because most beaches in the world that sit below big cliffs disappear beneath the tide for part of every day. Production designer Aline Bonetto and her location manager Charles Somers considered 47 countries and visited several of them before they found what they were looking for. Bonetto explained that, "Italy had beautiful weather, a beautiful blue-green sea, not too much tide, not too much wave. Our effects team added some cliffs in post-production and it was the perfect way to go". The estuary at Lower Halstow in Kent is featured in the scene in which Diana arrives at a Belgian creek to make her way to the warfront. Bill Westenhofer served as the visual effects supervisor for the film and Martin Walsh served as editor.

Music 

On November 3, 2016, Rupert Gregson-Williams was hired to write and compose the film's music. He was joined by Evan Jolly, Tom Howe, Paul Mounsey, and Andrew Kawczynski, who provided additional music. The soundtrack was released on CD, digital and vinyl the same day as the film. Australian musician Sia sang a song for the film, titled "To Be Human", featuring English musician Labrinth. Written by Florence Welch and Rick Nowels, the track is also featured on the soundtrack. The soundtrack also features samples from Wonder Woman's theme "Is She with You" from the Batman v Superman: Dawn of Justice soundtrack composed by Hans Zimmer and Junkie XL.

Additional music featured in the film are: "Another Little Drink Wouldn't Do Us Any Harm" by Clifford Grey and Nat Ayer and performed by Edgar Trevor and Cecil Cooper; "Molly O'Morgan" written by Fred Godfrey and Will Letters and performed by Ella Retford; "It's a Long Way to Tipperary" written by Jack Judge and Harry Williams; "Sous les ponts de Paris" written by Jean Rodor and Vincent Scotto and performed by Lucienne Delyle; "I'll Walk Beside You" written by Edward Lockton and Alan Murray and performed by Ewen Bremner; "Green Grow the Rushes, O" written by Robert Burns and performed by Ewen Bremner; and "Schatzwalzer Op. 4" written by Johann Strauss II and performed by the Berlin String Quartet.

Marketing

The success of the superhero television series Supergirl informed the marketing and promotion strategy used for Wonder Woman. According to Time Warner chief marketing officer Kristen O'Hara, they wanted to approach the Wonder Woman marketing campaign in a light manner, similar to how they did with Supergirl. O'Hara elaborated that the modest campaign route they took for Supergirl aided in establishing a large central fanbase among women well in advance of the series, which reportedly generated 5million female superhero fans in one week. They were then able to model over time and grow that audience leading up to the 15-months-later release of Wonder Woman. Though neither the film nor the series are aimed exclusively at women, the latter's campaign gave them their first opportunity to begin collecting data about female superhero fans. In May 2017, a promo for Wonder Woman was released during the season finale of Supergirl, featuring a remix of the song "These Boots Are Made for Walkin' and Supergirl (Melissa Benoist) wearing Wonder Woman's boots. The promo included an appearance by Lynda Carter, star of the 1970s Wonder Woman, who plays the American president on Supergirl.

The costs for television advertisements for Wonder Woman are higher in comparison to that of previous DCEU film Suicide Squad. Warner Bros. has spent over $3 million on advertisements for Wonder Woman, whereas they spent $2.6 million on advertisements for Suicide Squad. Ticket selling site Fandango reported that Wonder Woman rounded the final leg of its marketing campaign as the most anticipated blockbuster of summer 2017, according to a poll conducted by 10,000 voters, the biggest survey in company history. Separately, Fandango also found that 92% of people surveyed said that they are looking forward to seeing a film that features a standalone woman superhero and 87% wished Hollywood would make more women-led superhero films. In May 2017, NASCAR driver Danica Patrick drove her No. 10 car with a Wonder Woman paint scheme at the Go Bowling 400 in Kansas and at the Monster Energy Open in Charlotte.

Release

Theatrical
Wonder Woman had its world premiere on May 25, 2017, at Pantages Theatre in Hollywood, Los Angeles. The film's London premiere, which was scheduled to take place on May 31 at the Odeon Leicester Square, was canceled due to the Manchester Arena bombing. The film had its Latin America premiere in Mexico City on May 27. It was released in most of the world, including in IMAX, on June 2, 2017, after originally being scheduled for June 23. Belgium, Singapore and South Korea received the film first, with May 31 openings. On April 17, it was announced that Wonder Woman would be released in China on June 2, the same day as its North American release.

Home media
Wonder Woman was released on Digital HD on August 29, 2017, and on Blu-ray, Blu-ray 3D, 4K Ultra-HD Blu-ray and DVD on September 19, 2017. The film debuted at the top spot of both the NPD VideoScan overall disc sales chart and the Blu-ray Disc sales chart.

Controversies

Arab countries ban
On May 31, Wonder Woman was banned in Lebanon after the Campaign to Boycott Supporters of Israel asked the Lebanese government's Ministry of Economy and Trade to block the film because its star, Gal Gadot, is a former Israel Defense Forces soldier. The Lebanese government did not ban Gadot's Fast & Furious films which did screen in Lebanon. On June 6, Variety reported that Algiers, the capital of Algeria, pulled the film from the "Nuits du Cinéma" film festival. On June 7, Variety also reported that a Tunisian court suspended the theatrical release of Wonder Woman after a lawsuit brought by the Al-Chaab party and the Tunisian Association of Young Lawyers to have the film blocked due to Gadot's military service and public comments she made in support of the Israeli military during the 2014 Israel–Gaza conflict between her native Israel and the Palestinian enclave of the Gaza Strip. Jordan was reportedly also considering a ban of the film and suspended screenings pending a decision, but on June 11, it was reported that the government decided not to do so, as there was no legal precedent for it. On June 30, Qatar issued a ban on the film.

Women-only screenings
Women-only screenings were held at the Alamo Drafthouse Cinema in Austin, Texas. Opponents of the gender-restricted screening stated on Facebook that such screenings were discriminatory against men. An Albany Law School professor initiated a complaint with Austin's Equal Employment and Fair Housing Office claiming discrimination against male prospective customers and employees of the theater. The chain responded with an online statement saying the event "may have created confusion—we want everybody to see this film" and announced a similar event at their Brooklyn location. Tickets sold out in less than an hour, prompting the chain to schedule additional screenings. On July 18, Alamo Drafthouse proposed settlement offers of a Wonder Woman DVD to the complainants, stating "Respondent did not realize that advertising a 'women's only' screening was a violation of discrimination laws."

Reception

Box office
Wonder Woman grossed $412.6 million in the United States and Canada and $409.3 million in other territories for a worldwide total of $821.8 million, against an estimated production budget of $120–150 million. Estimates for the number the film needed to surpass internationally in order to cover its production and promotional costs and break even ranged from $300 million to $460 million. Deadline Hollywood calculated the net profit of the film to be $252.9 million, accounting for production budgets, P&A, talent participations and other costs, with box office grosses and ancillary revenues from home media, placing it sixth on their list of 2017's "Most Valuable Blockbusters".

United States and Canada
In May 2017, early tracking had Wonder Woman opening with $65–75 million and possibly as high as $105 million. The film opened Friday, June 2, 2017, across 4,165 theaters and made $38.2 million on its opening day, including $3.7 million in IMAX. It was the biggest single-day gross for a woman-directed film, ahead of the $35.9 million opening Friday of Catherine Hardwicke's Twilight in 2008 and the biggest opening day for a woman-led comic book superhero film, ahead of Ghost in the Shell ($7 million). This included $11 million it made from Thursday previews, also the best start for a film directed by a woman, surpassing Fifty Shades of Greys $8.6 million which was directed by Sam Taylor-Johnson and the third-biggest of the year, behind Beauty and the Beast and Guardians of the Galaxy Vol. 2. Of that, $1.5 million came from IMAX screenings.

Earning a total of $103.3 million on its opening weekend, the film recorded a number of records: the biggest domestic opening of all time for a female director (surpassing previous record holder Fifty Shades of Grey), the biggest DC Comics release without Batman or Superman (ahead of Constantine), the sixth-biggest non-sequel comic book superhero debut ever, as well as the sixth-biggest June debut weekend. Its three-day opening alone made it the highest-grossing woman-led comic book superhero film ever (surpassing Ghost in the Shell). It was also the 16th superhero film to cross $100 million in its domestic box office launch. About 9% ($9 million) of the opening weekend came from IMAX screenings from 343 theaters. In its second week the film grossed $58.5 million, again topping the box office. It marked a 43.3% drop for its second weekend at the box office, better than the average 50–60% decline superhero films tend to see and was a better second weekend than Batman v Superman: Dawn of Justice ($51.3 million) and Suicide Squad ($43.5 million). In its third weekend it grossed $41.2 million, finishing second behind newcomer Cars 3 ($53.5 million). It was the second-best third weekend ever for Warner Bros. and was nearly double what Batman v Superman ($23.3 million), Suicide Squad ($20.9 million) and Man of Steel ($20.7 million) made in their third weekends. It earned $24.9 million and $15.7 million in its fourth and fifth weekends, respectively, dropping just 39% and 36% despite facing rough competition from opening films Transformers: The Last Knight and Despicable Me 3. It eventually became the highest-grossing film directed by a woman, surpassing the previous records of Jennifer Yuh Nelson's Kung Fu Panda 2 and Phyllida Lloyd's Mamma Mia!, while also holding the record worldwide until Hi, Mom surpassed it in 2021. By August 8, the film had garnered $400 million in ticket sales, becoming the second female-fueled film (after Disney's Beauty and the Beast), Warner Bros.' third-biggest movie (after Christopher Nolan's The Dark Knight and The Dark Knight Rises), holding the record of the highest-earning superhero origin film, replacing the previous record held by Spider-Man (2002). It also becoming the highest-earning film with a female director in terms of domestic earnings—surpassing Frozen (2013).

Other countries
Beyond the US and Canada, the film was released day-and-date with its North American debut in 55 markets (72% of its total release) and was projected to debut with anywhere between $92–118 million. It ended up opening to $125 million, including $38 million in China, $8.5 million in Korea, $8.4 million in Mexico, $8.3 million in Brazil and $7.5 million in the UK. In its second week of release, the film brought in another $60 million, including holding the top spot on France, the UK, Australia and Brazil. In the Philippines, it broke 2017 box office record for highest-earning non-holiday opening day—earning $4.7 million and becoming the 9th-most successful commercial film of all time as well overtaking the record set by Batman v Superman: Dawn of Justice. The film opened in its last market, Japan, on August 25 and debuted to $3.4 million, helping the international gross cross the $400 million mark. The biggest markets of Wonder Woman outside North America are China (US$90million) followed by Brazil (US$34million), UK (US$28million), Australia ($23million) and Mexico ($22million).

Critical response

Wonder Woman received positive response from critics, with some calling it the DC Extended Universe's best film, praising Jenkins's direction and the acting, chemistry between Gadot and Pine, musical score and action sequences. The website's critical consensus reads, "Thrilling, earnest and buoyed by Gal Gadot's charismatic performance, Wonder Woman succeeds in spectacular fashion." It was the fourth highest-rated superhero film on the site. On Metacritic, the film has a weighted average score of 76 out of 100, based on 50 critics, indicating "generally favorable reviews". Audiences polled by CinemaScore gave the film an average grade of "A" on an A+ to F scale, while PostTrak reported filmgoers gave it an 85% overall positive score and a 73% "definite recommend".

Critics commented favorably on Gadot's performance of the titular character and Chris Pine's Steve Trevor. Andrew Barker of Variety found the film to be more lighthearted than recent DC Comics films:

Vox stated "Trevor is the superhero girlfriend comic book movies need". The San Francisco Chronicles Mick LaSalle lauded the performances of Gadot, Pine, Huston and Thewlis while commending the film's "different perspective" and humor. Richard Roeper of Chicago Sun-Times described Gadot's performance as inspirational, heroic, heartfelt and endearing and the most "real" Wonder Woman portrayal.

A. O. Scott of The New York Times wrote that it "briskly shakes off blockbuster branding imperatives and allows itself to be something relatively rare in the modern superhero cosmos. It feels less like yet another installment in an endless sequence of apocalyptic merchandising opportunities than like ... what's the word I'm looking for? A movie. A pretty good one, too." Michael Phillips of Chicago Tribune compared the film to Captain America: The First Avenger, noting that as with "the first Captain America movie over in the Marvel Comics universe, DC's Wonder Woman offers the pleasures of period re-creation for a popular audience. Jenkins and her design team make 1918-era London; war-torn Belgium; the Ottoman Empire; and other locales look freshly realized, with a strong point of view. There are scenes here of dispossessed war refugees, witnessed by an astonished and heartbroken Diana, that carry unusual gravity for a comic book adaptation." Katie Erbland of IndieWire commended its thematic depth, explaining that "Wonder Woman is a war movie. Patty Jenkins' first—and we hope not last—entry into the DC Expanded Universe is primarily set during World War I, but while the feature doesn't balk at war-time violence, it's the internal battles of its compelling heroine that are most vital." Alonso Duralde of TheWrap similarly felt that, "Diana's scenes of action are thrilling precisely because they're meant to stop war, not to foment it; the idea of a demi-god using love to fight war might sound goofy in the abstract, but Jenkins makes the concept work." Ann Hornaday of The Washington Post praised Gadot and Pine's performances as well the film's detailed plot and narrative while comparing of some slow-motion action sequences to The Matrix. Stephanie Zacharek of Time magazine hailed the film as a "cut above nearly all the superhero movies that have been trotted out over the past few summers" while praising Gadot's performance as "charming" and "marvelous" and commending Jenkins's direction of the film as a step forward for women directors in directing big-budget blockbuster films in Hollywood.

Elise Jost of Moviepilot observed that "Gadot's take on Wonder Woman is one of those unique cases of an actor merging with their story, similar to Robert Downey Jr.'s Tony Stark. Gal Gadot is Wonder Woman and Wonder Woman is Gal Gadot." Jost praised Gadot's interpretation of Wonder Woman as the one in which Gadot "absolutely nails the character's unwaveringly positive outlook on life. She's a force of nature who believes in the greater good; her conviction that she's meant to save the world is stronger than her bullet-deflecting shield. She's genuine, she's fun, she's the warm source of energy at the heart of the movie." On HuffPost cultural critic, G. Roger Denson, who regards the superhero genre as a source of contemporary "Mainstream Mythopoetics" ("the making of new yet vitally meaningful, if not symbolic, stories filled with imagery reflecting, yet also shaping and advancing, the political, legal, moral and social practices of today"), wrote that the "No Man's Land" scene "that people are crying over in theaters and raving about afterward happens to be among the most powerfully mythopoetic scenes ever filmed at the same time it is one of the oldest myths to have been utilized by artists and writers after it had been invented by early military strategists and leaders." Specifically "used by director Patty Jenkins", the scene raises "the esteem for powerful yet compassionate women as heroes and leaders to a level equal with that of men for having won over a huge and adoring popular audience around the world".

Steve Rose in The Guardian criticized the film for failing to explore the material's potential for "patriarchy-upending subversion". Peter Travers of Rolling Stone criticized the film's over-reliance on exposition: "Wonder Woman is hobbled by a slogging origin story and action that only comes in fits and starts. Just when Gadot and director Patty Jenkins...are ready to kick ass, we get backstory."

"Gas was intended to win the war. On that much Wonder Woman is absolutely right." said David Hambling in Popular Mechanics. Rachel Becker of The Verge stated that despite the scientific liberties of using a "hydrogen-based" chemical weapon as a plot device, the film succeeds in evoking real and horrifying history. "First off, mustard gas is such a horrible, terrifying weapon, it doesn't need to be made more potent. But if you were a chemist bent on raining destruction on the Allied forces, you wouldn't do it by replacing the sulfur atom in mustard gas with a hydrogen atom. You'd know that sulfur is the linchpin holding together this poisonous molecule."

One notable criticism was directed towards aspects of the final act, with the reveal of Ares and the climactic fight. Patty Jenkins later admitted when promoting Wonder Woman 1984 that it was studio mandated, with her commenting “that was the only thing that the studio forced my hand on was that it was not supposed to be, it was supposed to be like, that he never turns into Ares, the whole point of the movie is that you get there to the big monster, and he’s just standing there looking at you saying, I didn’t do anything. And then the studio kept saying, we’ll let you do that, and then we’ll see. And then I could feel it creeping up, and then at the last minute, they were like, you know what? We want Ares to show up. And I was like, we don’t have time to do that now. Nope, you gotta do it!"

Accolades

Cultural impact

Wonder Woman, according to the BBC had "some thinking it's too feminist and others thinking it's not feminist enough". Kyle Killian found an inherent contradiction in the construction of Wonder Woman as "a warrior" who, she states, is also highly sexualized. Killian thus suggests that these elements "should not be the focus of a kickass heroine—her beauty, bone structure and sexiness—if she is to be a feminist icon". Theresa Harold concurred, comparing Wonder Woman to Katniss Everdeen (of The Hunger Games), who "didn't have to wear a teenager's wet dream of a costume to fight in". Christina Cauterucci also felt that Wonder Woman's ability to be considered a "feminist antidote" was undermined by her "sex appeal". Other critics refer to the construction of Wonder Woman in the film as "an implausible post-feminist hero".

Jenkins disagrees with this line of critique. She has stated that she was raised by a second-wave "feminist mother", who taught her to be "both super aware that there had been sexism but also: 'Congratulations—thank you, now I get to do whatever I want, Mom! Jenkins thus notes that it is this upbringing which has led her to question a feminist critique of Wonder Woman's costume. When she was working on her own version of Wonder Woman's "Gladiator" re-design of the outfit (in the 2016 film Batman v Superman: Dawn of Justice) Jenkins decided that Wonder Woman (as well as the other Amazons) "shouldn't be dressed in armor like men ... It should be different ... I, as a woman, want Wonder Woman to be hot as hell, fight badass and look great at the same time—the same way men want Superman to have huge pecs and an impractically big body." Jenkins also notes that she is "frustrated" by the critique of Wonder Woman's appearance, stating "when people get super critical about her outfit, who's the one getting crazy about what a woman wears? That's who she is; that's Wonder Woman." Gal Gadot concurred with Jenkins, arguing that the character "is a feminist" as "feminism is about equality and choice and freedom. And the writers, Patty and myself all figured that the best way to show that is to show Diana as having no awareness of social roles. She has no gender boundaries. To her, everyone is equal."

Critic Valerie Estelle Frankel supported Jenkins's vision. Frankel argues that the film subverts the male gaze, stating that the construction of Wonder Woman tends to shift every few decades as it reflects the state of feminism during different time periods, including third-wave feminism (which reflects Jenkins's approach). Zoe Williams offers a similar argument, stating that while Wonder Woman "is sort of naked a lot of the time," that is not, at the same time, "objectification so much as a cultural reset: having thighs, actual thighs you can kick things with, not thighs that look like arms, is a feminist act". Williams then juxtaposes Wonder Woman with past female action heroes Sarah Connor, Ellen Ripley and Lara Croft, whom she suggests were all constructed for the male gaze, in which a "female warrior becomes a sex object", (a point which she argues that Jenkins directly references in the film).

Gloria Steinem also liked the film, stating that she felt it made the "Amazon origin story clear; [Wonder Woman] was stopping war, not perpetuating it." Steinem also noted that she knew "some women were disappointed by all the makeup, but I may be desperate—I was just happy that the Amazons had wild hair!" Her only complaint lay in the choice to eliminate the World War II setting as the Wonder Woman comic book developed in response to existing comics that were "so sadistic and racist that there was a congressional hearing on the subject". Steinem also gave Hillary Clinton the first Wonder Woman Award in October 2017 during the Women's Media Center's "Speaking Truth to Power Awards" (an organization created by Steinem, Jane Fonda and Robin Morgan). Upon receiving the award, Clinton noted that she had seen Jenkins's Wonder Woman film and that she "loved the outfit". She also said that as her granddaughter was "really keen" on Wonder Woman, Clinton "thought maybe I could borrow something from her for the night. It didn't quite work for me, but I will say that this award means a lot to me because as a little girl and then as a young woman and then as a slightly older woman, I always wondered when Wonder Woman would have her time and now that has happened." Clinton had previously praised Jenkins's film, in a public August 2017 message, stating that "it was just as inspirational as I'd suspected a movie about a strong, powerful woman in a fight to save the world from international disaster would be."

Director James Cameron continued this debate, through his critique of the representation of female power in Jenkins's film. In an August 2017 interview with The Guardian, Cameron qualifies Jenkins's vision of Wonder Woman as "an objectified icon" and called the film "a step backwards". In contrast, he states, his character Sarah Connor (from his Terminator films) "was not a beauty icon. She was strong, she was troubled, she was a terrible mother and she earned the respect of the audience through pure grit." Jenkins stated in response that Cameron's "inability to understand what 'Wonder Woman' is, or stands for, to women all over the world is unsurprising as, though he is a great filmmaker, he is not a woman". She further argued "there is no right and wrong kind of powerful woman" because "if women have to always be hard, tough and troubled to be strong and we aren't free to be multidimensional or celebrate an icon of women everywhere because she is attractive and loving, then we haven't come very far have we." Reaction to this debate was mixed. Julie Miller sided with Cameron, whom she states refers to himself as "a pretty hardcore feminist" and who told Vulture that "I have no problem writing a script in which the males become subservient to the females, which is what happens in Aliens ... It's up to Ripley to win the day." In contrast, Miller argues that Jenkins and Gadot envisioned Wonder Woman as "a woman who exuded both femininity and strength, along with genuine confusion as to why men would treat women differently than they do other men". Susannah Breslin also agreed with Cameron, describing Jenkins's Wonder Woman as "a Playmate with a lasso" and "female power with no balls". Others were more critical of Cameron's critique. An article in Newsweek suggests that in contrast to his criticism of Jenkins, Cameron's own films include "lot of objectification" and quotes a few Hollywood celebrities who echoed this view. One of the quotes came from
Jesse McLaren who states that "James Cameron's just confused there's a female hero whose motivations aren't centered around motherhood." Noah Berlatsky found areas of agreement between both Cameron and Jenkins, stating that while Cameron's objection is "an old point that's been made over and over for decades", Jenkins's film is not "solely focused on objectifying Gal Gadot for a male audience".

A few weeks later in September, Cameron reiterated his criticism in an interview with The Hollywood Reporter. He compared Gal Gadot's representation of the character to Raquel Welch films of the 1960s, and reinforced a comparison with Linda Hamilton's portrayal of Sarah Connor. He argued that Connor was "if not ahead of its time, at least a breakthrough in its time" because though she "looked great", she "wasn't treated as a sex object". He also stated that he while he "applaud[s] Patty directing the film and Hollywood, uh, 'letting' a woman direct a major action franchise, I didn't think there was anything groundbreaking in Wonder Woman. I thought it was a good film. Period." Former Wonder Woman actress Lynda Carter responded to Cameron's The Hollywood Reporter interview by asking him to "Stop dissing WW." Like Jenkins, she suggests that while Cameron does "not understand the character", she does. She also refers to Cameron's critiques as "thuggish jabs at a brilliant director" that are as "ill advised" as the "movie was spot on." Carter also states that she has the authority to make these observations because she has "embodied this character for more than 40 years". A month later, Jenkins responded to Cameron's comments once again in an interview with Variety, stating that she "was not upset at all", as "everybody is entitled to their own opinion. But if you're going to debate something in a public way, I have to reply that I think it's incorrect." Tricia Ennis was also critical of Cameron's statements, arguing that "while he may consider himself a feminist and an ally to women, [he] is not very good at it" as being an ally means using his position of privilege "without silencing the voices of those you're trying to help". She also states that it "is not enough to simply call yourself a feminist. It's not even enough to create a strong female character ... You have to bring women to the table. You have to let them speak. You cannot speak for them. But speaking for women is exactly what Cameron is doing through his comments ... Cameron is using his position of power as a respected producer and director to silence women."

Future

Sequel

Originally signed for three feature films, with Wonder Woman and Justice League being her second and third films, Gadot signed an extension to her contract for additional films. Jenkins initially signed for only one film, but in an interview with Variety, Geoff Johns revealed that he and Jenkins were writing the treatment for a Wonder Woman sequel and that he has a "cool idea for the second one". At the 2017 San Diego Comic Con, Warner Bros. officially announced a sequel would be released on December 13, 2019, and would be titled Wonder Woman 2; the date later was moved to November 1, 2019, to avoid competition with Star Wars: The Rise of Skywalker. Later, Jenkins was officially signed to return as director, with confirmation that Gadot will be returning as the titular role. Days later, the studio hired David Callaham to co-write the film's script with Jenkins and Johns. In March 2018, Kristen Wiig was confirmed to play Cheetah, the villain of the film. That same month, it was announced that Pedro Pascal would have a key role in the film. By May 2018, long-time DCEU producer Zack Snyder confirmed on social media platform Vero that he, along with wife Deborah Snyder, would serve as producers on the Wonder Woman sequel. In June 2018, the title of the film was announced to be Wonder Woman 1984. The film's release was delayed several times, including owing to the COVID-19 pandemic, and was not released until December 16, 2020.

Spin-off
It was announced that an Amazons spin-off film is in the works with Patty Jenkins executive producing the film.

Notes

References

External links

 
 
 
 

2010s English-language films
2010s American films
2010s fantasy adventure films
2010s superhero films
2010s feminist films
2017 action films
2017 3D films
American action films
American 3D films
American fantasy action films
American fantasy adventure films
American superhero films
American science fantasy films
American science fiction action films
American science fiction war films
American World War I films
American prequel films
Ares in popular culture
Atlas Entertainment films
Censored films
DC Extended Universe films
Fiction about deicide
Fantasy war films
Films about chemical war and weapons
Films scored by Rupert Gregson-Williams
Films based on classical mythology
Films directed by Patty Jenkins
Films produced by Charles Roven
Films produced by Deborah Snyder
Films produced by Richard Suckle
Films produced by Zack Snyder
Films set in 1918
Films set in 2017
Films set in a fictional country
Films set in Belgium
Films set in France
Films set in Germany
Films set in London
Films set in the Mediterranean Sea
Films set in the Ottoman Empire
Films set on fictional islands
Films shot in London
Films shot in Hertfordshire
Films shot in Matera
Fratricide in fiction
IMAX films
Film controversies in Lebanon
Salary controversies in film
Supernatural war films
Tencent Pictures films
Prequel films
American war adventure films
Warner Bros. films
Western Front (World War I) films
Wonder Woman (film series)
Wonder Woman films
Hugo Award for Best Dramatic Presentation, Long Form winning works
Cultural depictions of Erich Ludendorff
Films with screenplays by Zack Snyder
Greek and Roman deities in fiction
The Stone Quarry films
Chinese prequel films